Oor Mariyadhai is a 1992 Indian Tamil-language drama film directed by K. S. Ravikumar. The film stars Sarathkumar, Sasikala, Napoleon and Anand. It revolves around Rathnavelu (Sarathkumar), who is in love with Rasathi (Sasikala) who, however, loves Kannan (Anand). When her mother discovers this fact she gets her forcefully married to Rathnavelu leading to Kannan committing suicide and his brother swearing revenge. 

The film, produced by R. B. Choudary, was released on 1 May 1992.

Plot 
Rathnavelu is a respected man in his village, whereas Veerapandi, a womaniser, is hated by everyone. Rathnavelu loves his niece Rasathi, while his cousin Kamachi loves him. Kannan, Veerapandi's brother, returns to his village after studying in the city. Kannan and Rasathi fall in love with each other.

In the past, Rasathi's father Chinna Raja won the village's prestige price for the first time. The angry Muthupandi Thevar, Veerapandi's father, could not bear it, so he tried to kill Chinna Raja, and they finally killed each other.

Knowing the relationship between Kannan and Rasathi, Rasathi's mother forces her brother Rathnavelu to marry Rasathi. The next day, Kannan is found hanged. Rasathi is still shocked by her lover's death, and Veerapandi only wants to take revenge on Rathnavelu's family. What transpires later forms the crux of the story.

Cast 

Sarathkumar as Rathnavelu
Sasikala as Rasathi
Napoleon as Veerapandi
Anand as Kannan
Srividya as Rasathi's mother and Rathnavelu's sister
Sindhu as Kamachi
Goundamani as Mahadevan
Senthil
V. Gopalakrishnan as Arumugam Thevar
Delhi Ganesh as Veerapandi's uncle
Vijayakumar as Chinna Raja (guest appearance)
Kitty as Muthupandi Thevar (guest appearance)
Kumarimuthu
Ganthimathi as Chinna Thaayi
K. S. Jayalakshmi as Mahadevan's wife
Pratibha
R. N. Kumaresan
Typist Gopu
Bayilvan Ranganathan as Muniyandi
K. S. Ravikumar as Rakappan
 Rajavelu

Soundtrack 
The music was composed by Deva, with lyrics by Kalidasan. The song "Unna Naan Thottathukku" was originally composed for the film Adhikaalai Subavelai which never released.

References

External links 
 

1990s Tamil-language films
1992 drama films
1992 films
Films directed by K. S. Ravikumar
Films scored by Deva (composer)
Indian drama films
Super Good Films films